KRSA may refer to:

 KRSA, Korea Robot Sports Association, A Non-Profit organization in Korea. This organization organize an annual Korea International Robot Olympiad every summer which over 1000 students interested in robotics have participated in.
 KMVS (FM), a radio station (89.3 FM) licensed to serve Moss Beach, California, which held the call sign KRSA from 2015 to 2017
 KRSA (defunct), a defunct radio station (580 AM) formerly licensed to serve Petersburg, Alaska, United States